Arthur Skinner (1874–1940) was a New Zealand policeman and athlete. He was born in Fetternear, Aberdeenshire, Scotland in 1874.

References

1874 births
1940 deaths
New Zealand sportsmen
Scottish emigrants to New Zealand
New Zealand police officers